Adriano in Siria (Hadrian in Syria) is a libretto by Italian poet Metastasio first performed, with music by Antonio Caldara, in Vienna in 1732, and turned into an opera by at least 60 other composers during the next century. Metastasio based the background of the story on late Classical works by Cassius Dio (Book 19 of the Roman History) and Elio Sparziano (Vita Hadriani Caesaris).

The aria Che fa il mio bene? also known as L'amante impaziente, sung by the character Emirena, was set to music by Ludwig van Beethoven in his Opus 82: 4 Arietten und ein Duett.

Performances

The libretto was composed for Charles VI, Holy Roman Emperor and premiered in the Theater am Kärntnertor in Vienna on 4 November 1732. The scenes were designed by Antonio Galli da Bibiena (1697–1774). A revised version was first performed in 1733, with music by Giacomelli.

Some of the later operas based on this libretto were also created for royal festivities: the version by Pergolesi was intended for the birthday of Elisabeth Farnese, the Queen of Spain, and premiered at the Teatro San Bartolomeo in Naples on 25 October 1734, with the castrato Caffarelli singing the part of Farnaspe, which was radically altered from the first version of just two years earlier. In the yet again altered version of 1735 by Francesco Maria Veracini, written for the short-lived but ambitious Opera of the Nobility in London, the same role was sung by Farinelli, joined in an all-star cast by Senesino, Francesca Cuzzoni and Antonio Montagnana (Burden 2007, 31). George Frederic Handel was present at the premiere in Haymarket Theatre. Charles Jennens liked the opera and ordered a score; Lord Hervey, not known for his musical perception, and Henry Liddell, 1st Baron Ravensworth were bored (Dean 2006, 278–79; Van Til 2007, 121). However, the work enjoyed a run of twenty performances over six months (Helyard 2000).

In 1768–69, Ignaz Holzbauer also composed an opera based on the libretto by Metastasio, this time to be performed at the royal wedding between Amalie of Zweibrücken-Birkenfeld and Frederick Augustus I of Saxony on 29 January 1769. The 1765 version by Johann Christian Bach, while not especially created for a royal occasion, was even visited twice by George III of the United Kingdom and his wife Charlotte of Mecklenburg-Strelitz when it was performed in London in 1765.

As a royalist or even imperialist opera, it was badly received by Republicans and revolutionaries. In 1792, Étienne Méhul had finished his version Adrien with a libretto by François-Benoît Hoffman based on Metastasio; it was set to premier at the Paris Opera on 6 March 1792, but the Commune opposed it, as the opera was written by an Austrian (Anti-Austrian sentiments were running high at the time and France would declare war on Austria the next month), and the theme was imperialistic, which went against the ideals of the French Revolution. The premier was postponed for a week, and Hoffman defended his work in an open letter, but to no avail, as the work was banned on 12 March 1792. It finally premiered in 1799, but was again shut down by the Directory after four performances.

Roles

Adriano: governor of Syria, in love with Emirena
Emirena: prisoner of Adriano, in love with Farnaspe
Farnaspe: friend of Osroa and prince of the Parths, in love with and betrothed to Emirena
Osroa: King of the Parthian Empire, father of Emirena
Sabina: in love with and betrothed to Adriano
Aquilio: tribune, friend of Adriano and secretly in love with Sabina

Synopsis
Set in Antioch against the historic background of the time the future Roman Emperor Hadrian spent as Governor of Syria, it tells a fictional love story, where the virtue of Adriano is tested by his infatuation with Emirena, a Parthian princess, both before and after his marriage to Sabina. One of the subplots in the story is the attempt by Osroa to kill Adriano in a fire. Eventually, all ends well, Osroa is spared, Farnaspe marries Emirena, and Adriano returns to the love of his wife Sabina.

Operas based on the Metastasio libretto

1732: Antonio Caldara
1733: Geminiano Giacomelli
1734: Giovanni Battista Pergolesi, Adriano in Siria
1734: Pietro Giuseppe Sandoni
1735: Francesco Maria Veracini (adaptation of the libretto by Angelo Cori)
1735: Riccardo Broschi
1736: Egidio Duni
1737: Giovanni Battista Ferrandini
1737: José de Nebra, Adriano en Siria o Más gloria es triunfar de sí
1737: Giovanni Porta
1739: Giovanni Alberto Ristori
1740: Baldassare Galuppi
1740: Michele Caballone
1740: Giovanni Battista Lampugnani
1740: Antonio Giai
1745: Giovanni Verocai, Die getreue Emirena Parthische Prinzeßin
1745: Carl Heinrich Graun, Artabanus
1746: Girolamo Abos
1746: Paolo Scalabrini
1747: Gaetano Latilla
1747-48: Vincenzo Legrenzio Ciampi
1750: Ignazio Fiorillo
1750: Giovan Battista Pescetti
1750: Antonio Gaetano Pampani
1751: Andrea Adolfati
1752: Giuseppe Scarlatti
1752: Johann Adolph Hasse
1752: Davide Perez
1753: Michelangelo Valentini
1753: Giuseppe Scolari
1754: Nicola Conforto
1755: Andrea Bernasconi
1756: Rinaldo di Capua
1757: Francesco Uttini
1757: Francesco Brusa
1758: Giovanni Battista Borghi
1758: Baldassare Galuppi (second version)
1760: Antonio Maria Mazzoni
1762: Johann Gottfried Schwanenberger
1762: Giuseppe Colla
1763: Gregorio Sciroli
1764: Marian Wimmer
1765: Pietro Alessandro Guglielmi
1765: Johann Christian Bach
1768: Ignaz Holzbauer
1768: Hieronymus Mango
1769: Gian Francesco de Majo
1769: Carlo Monza
1770: Antonio Sacchini
1770: Antonio Tozzi
1773: Giacomo Insanguine
1775: Gaetano Monti
1776: Josef Mysliveček, Adriano in Siria
1777: Pasquale Anfossi
1778: Giuseppe Sarti
1779: Felice Alessandri
1781: Giacomo Rust
1782: Luigi Cherubini
1788: Jakob Friedrich Gauss, Hadrian in Syrien
1789: Sebastiano Nasolini
1798: Simon Mayr
1799: Étienne Méhul, Adrien, libretto by François-Benoît Hoffman adapted from Metastasio
1807: Joseph Weigl, Kaiser Hadrian
1811: Vincento Migliorucci
1813: Marcos Portugal
1815: Giuseppe Farinelli
1821: Pietro Airoldi
1828: Saverio Mercadante

References

External links

Opera seria
Italian-language operas
Operas
Libretti by Metastasio
1732 operas